Ola Elvestuen (born 9 October 1967) is a Norwegian politician for the Liberal Party who served as Minister of Climate and the Environment from 2018 to 2020. He was also the party's deputy leader from 2008 to 2020 (2008–2012 as second deputy and 2012–2020 as first deputy), and has been an MP for Oslo since 2013.

Personal life
He is married to Greta Elvestuen.  

He is a younger brother of illustrator Per Elvestuen.

Political career

Party politics
In 2008, he became second deputy leader of his party, and then first deputy in 2012, which he was until 2020.

Local politics
On the local level Elvestuen is a member of Oslo city council, and served as city commissioner for public transport and environmental affairs from 2011 until his election to Parliament in 2013.

Parliament
Elvestuen was a member of the Storting from Oslo in 2013, and served as leader of the Energy and the Environment Committee since 2013. He has been re-elected to Parliament since. 

Prior to this, he served as a deputy representative to the Storting from Oslo during from 2001 to 2013.

Minister of Climate and the Environment
After the Liberal Party entered the Solberg Cabinet, Elvestuen was appointed minister of climate and the environment on 17 January 2018, succeeding the Conservatives' Vidar Helgesen.

In April 2018, he announced that the government would be adding 2 million NOK to the "Fishing for litter" scheme for 2018, in response to plastic being discovered at a bird mountain in Runde.

In June, he announced that the government would approve the establishment of Lofotodden National Park in Nordland, which had been proposed by the municipalities of Moskenes and Flakstad.

In October, he praised Mattvett and Findus' advertisements at the Oslo train station, which showed that 335 000 tons of food is wasted a year. He notably praised them for raising awareness of food wasting and called on consumers to help reduce food waste.

In May 2019, Elvestuen expressed his disagreement with his Brazilian counterpart, Ricardo Salles, who had stated that Norway's billion contribution to the Amazon rain forest fund was futile. Elvestuen stated: "The fund as a whole has certainly contributed to reduced deforestation. Norway's cooperation with Brazil is results-based. All Norwegian funds are a reward for reducing deforestation".

Elvestuen was among the non-Progress Party ministers to be dismissed on 24 January 2020 alongside the Progress Party ministers, who stepped down as a result of their party withdrawing from government. He was succeeded by fellow Liberal Party member Sveinung Rotevatn.

In her self biography released in 2021 after her resignation, Siv Jensen described Elvestuen as the "most active cabinet member who wanted to tear down the coalition's cooperation". She also said that he demanded many postponed government conferences "by many hours" and "never gave up". Elvestuen refused to comment Jensen's recollection of him, but notes that there was hard fighting for many issues such as climate change, nature and drug reform.

References

 

1967 births
Living people
Deputy members of the Storting
Politicians from Oslo
Liberal Party (Norway) politicians
21st-century Norwegian politicians